Sky Valley may refer to:
 Sky Valley, California
 Sky Valley, Georgia
 Welcome to Sky Valley, Kyuss album
 Skykomish Valley, also known as Sky Valley